Orquesta Riverside (known as Orquesta Havana Riverside between 1938 and 1941) was a highly successful Cuban big band that was amongst the most popular ensembles of the 1940s and 1950s. Founded in 1938, it was originally directed by local musician  until 1945. Other directors were Antonio Sosa (1945–47), Pedro Vila (1947–57), Adolfo Guzmán (1957–62), Argelio González and Nelson Arocha.

In 1993, the ensemble disbanded after a long period lacking success. Years later, Raúl Nacianceno Miyares, a former saxophonist in the band, revived the name of the band with young music graduates, playing the same arrangements as 50 years ago.

Members 

Enrique González Mantici: director (1938–42)
José Curbelo: piano (1938–40)
Platanito: trumpet
Antonio Temprano: trumpet
Emilio Temprano: trombone
"Periquito" Temprano: clarinet, alto saxophone
José Nacianceno: clarinet, alto saxophone
Asdrúbal Pardo: tenor saxophone
Pedro Pardo: tenor saxophone
Antonio Sosa: guitar, tumbadora, director (1938–47)
Julio Belzaqui: double bass
Manolo Castro: vocals (1938)
Pedro Vargas: vocals (1939)
Mario Suárez: vocals (1939)
Guillermo Portabales: vocals (1939)
René Cabel: vocals (1939–40)
Chucho Martínez Gil: vocals (1939)
Miguelito Valdés: vocals (1940)
Anselmo Sacasas: piano (1940)
Juan Arvizu: vocals (1940)
Lupita Palomera: vocals (1940)
Juan Bruno Tarraza: piano
Tito Álvarez: vocals
Alberto Ruiz: vocals (until 1942)
Tito Gómez: lead vocals (1942–75)
Orlando Vallejo: vocals
Onelio Pérez: vocals
René Ravelo: saxophone
Gregorio Brenes: saxophone
José Simpson: saxophone
Raúl Nacianceno Mijares: saxophone
Miguel Antuña Benítez: saxophone
Roberto Arocha Morales: saxophone
Marcos Urbay: trumpet
Enrique Osorio: trumpet
José A. Martínez Daussac: trumpet
Mario del Monte Cossío: trumpet
Armando Galán Alfonso: trumpet
Roberto Morell del Campo: trombone
Edgar Díaz: drums
Sergio L. Núñez Molina: drums
Rolando Piloto Álvarez: drums
Orlando "Cachaíto" López: double bass
Roberto Martínez Capote: double bass
Baudilio Carbonell: bongo
Peruchín: piano, arranger (1946–59)
Ángel Fernández de la Osa: congas
Carlos Montero Bello: guitar
Pedro Vila: saxophone, director (1947–-57)
Leonardo Timor: trumpet (since 1956)
Generoso Jiménez: trombone
Adolfo Guzmán: piano, director (1957–62)
Paquito Hechavarría: piano
Rubén González: piano
Argelio González: director
Nelson Arocha Enseñat: piano, director, arranger
Orlando Montero Maldonado:vocals
Manuel "Guajiro" Mirabal: trumpet (1960s)
Joseíto González: piano (1980s)
Raúl Nacianceno: saxophone, director

References

Cuban musical groups
Big bands